Bruno Zarrillo (born September 5, 1966) is an Italian-Canadian retired professional ice hockey winger.

Achievements
1987 - Manitoba Major Junior Hockey League Champion with River East Royal Knights
1988 - Manitoba Major Junior Hockey League Champion with River East Royal Knights
1990 - Serie A Champion with HC Bolzano
1995 - Serie A Champion with HC Bolzano
1997 - NLA Champion with SC Bern
2004 - Serie A Champion with HC Milano Vipers

International play
Bruno Zarrillo played in the Olympics in 1992, 1994, 1998.  Additionally he represented Italy in the World Championships ten times.

External links
 Eurohockey Stats
 
 Bruno Zarrillo's Youth Hockey Academy
 Royal Knights home page
 Elite prospects

1966 births
Living people
Bolzano HC players
Canadian ice hockey forwards
Canadian people of Italian descent
HC Milano players
Ice hockey people from Winnipeg
Ice hockey players at the 1992 Winter Olympics
Ice hockey players at the 1994 Winter Olympics
Ice hockey players at the 1998 Winter Olympics
Kölner Haie players
Nürnberg Ice Tigers players
Olympic ice hockey players of Italy
SC Bern players
Canadian expatriate ice hockey players in Italy
Canadian expatriate ice hockey players in Germany
Canadian expatriate ice hockey players in Switzerland